Nathan Wylde is a fictional character from the British ITV soap opera Emmerdale, played by Lyndon Ogbourne. He made his first on-screen appearance on 17 February 2009 and his last on 26 November 2010.

Storylines
Nathan and his sister, Maisie, arrive in the village for their father's 50th birthday party. Nathan is immediately attracted to Katie Sugden (Sammy Winward), and when he hears that she has a date with Lee Naylor (Lewis Linford), Nathan delays him with questions about his work. Nathan - who attended agricultural college - is tasked with running the estate by his parents.  Nathan continues pursuing Katie, causing trouble between her and Lee by successfully manipulating them both. Following a row with Lee, Katie invites Nathan to spend the night with her. The next day, however, she catches him sneaking out and he admits to not wanting a serious relationship until he sees her reconcile with Lee.

Nathan works with Eric Pollard (Chris Chittell), assisting his campaign to be re-elected as local councillor, getting to Eric's son David Metcalfe (Matthew Wolfenden) who was standing against him, via his girlfriend, Leyla Harding (Roxy Shahidi). He gives her a job, an advance for new clothes and makes a large donation to her mother's nursing home. On finding out, Leyla asks him to withdraw it but he refuses, making it clear what he wants in return. Disgusted, she throws a suit at him and leaves. She tells David and they confront Nathan who loses his temper, and Leyla throws water over him to cool down. However, on 4 June, David is elected as councillor. In late June, Nathan is angry about Lee moving in with Katie so he causes trouble for them again and Lee quits his job. Angry, Katie ends her relationship with Nathan and throws Lee out. Nathan responds by trying to sabotage her business and Katie responds by telling him she is moving her business elsewhere but when this fails, Nathan delights in raising her rent.

Nathan befriends Ryan Lamb (James Sutton). He is not pleased when Ryan and Katie start dating but is more distressed with his father's "affair" with Ryan's mother Faye (Kim Thomson). He goes to London for a while to clear his head. Returning his attentions to Leyla in October, Nathan separates her and David by using his parents' contacts to get David more work. Leyla doesn't help when she borrows money from the petty cash in the farm shop's till and is caught when Nathan collects it early. He sees money missing but conceals it when Leyla confesses and starts charming her, taking her to exclusive parties. They sleep together but Leyla feels guilty so Nathan blackmails her to take responsibility for him crashing a car whilst drunk. Struggling with her conscience, Leyla tells David that she slept with Nathan and he splits up with her but he hits Nathan for bullying her. Nathan's mother Natasha realises that something is wrong and asks Katie, who tells her David hit Nathan but Nathan twists it so that Leyla gets the blame. Angry at Nathan's manipulation, she visits him and tells him she won't quit her job and knees him in the groin. After this, Nathan leaves Leyla alone.

In January, after his father's disappearance, Nathan takes over running Home Farm so Natasha can concentrate on taking care of Maisie and Will. Nathan is furious to discover that Faye is, in fact, Mark's first wife and Ryan is his half-brother, and that Natasha knew. Later in the month Natasha begins behaving erratically. Noticing her odd behaviour, Nathan confronts her and she tells him that she killed Mark and buried his body on the Estate grounds. Nathan is outraged and takes a shovel and tries to locate his father's body and dig it up. Natasha then subdues Nathan by telling him that it had been an accident and that the gun had discharged during a struggle. Nathan agrees to keep his mother's secret but demands her fortune in return. Natasha reluctantly gives him everything on the condition that he left and never returned. Nathan keeps his side of the bargain and leaves the village in early February.

In May 2010, Nathan returns, shocking his mother. She tells him to leave, and he stays the night at the B&B. Natasha later agrees to let him stay at Home Farm on one condition, that he pay back the money he blackmailed from her. Nathan pays back the money and Natasha lets him work for her again. Nathan takes an instant dislike to his mother's new business partner, Declan Macey (Jason Merrells) who had bought Nathan's share of the estate whilst he had been away. Nathan demanded his share back but Declan refuses to give it to him. Nathan is further enraged when Declan and Natasha begin a relationship and he threatens to report her to the police for his father's murder but Natasha threatens to take him down with her for helping her cover up the crime.
 
Nathan makes a deal with Declan after his plans for a barn renovation are turned down. Nathan offers to get the planning permission for Declan if he agreed to stay away from Natasha. To do this, Nathan blackmails local councillor David. He gets council employee Tania Page to attempt to seduce David and records it with a hidden video camera and makes it seem that he is having an affair. Nathan threatens to tell Leyla and show her the video if David did not agree to his demands. After David gets Nathan the planning permission, Declan notices that David appears unhappy and Nathan reveals that he blackmailed David, leaving Declan horrified.

In June 2010, a bouquet of flowers is sent to Home Farm and is signed with Mark's name and is paid for using his credit card. Natasha believes that Nathan sent the flowers as part of a sick joke and she throws them at his car as he drives up to the house. One of Mark's suits is sent to Declan's house and he confronts Nathan and accuses him of sending it. Nathan denies sending the flowers and the suit but he later pretends to confess to sending the flowers to Maisie in order to cover his mother's tracks.

Believing Nathan is the culprit, Maisie is upset and angry with him and orders him out of the pub when he comes in for a drink. Nathan goes to his car and discovers a not stuck to the windscreen saying "What are you hiding"? Nathan sees Ryan walking past and accuses him of being the stalker. Ryan is angry at the accusation and he and Nathan square up but Ryan's boss Cain Dingle (Jeff Hordley) breaks them up. Nathan gets in his car and drives home. Nathan later receives another note from the blackmailer arranging a meeting by the river. Nathan drives to the location and waits. The blackmailer reveals himself and it turns out to be Cain. Nathan asks Cain what he wants and Cain tells him that he knows the Wyldes are hiding something. He asks Nathan to arrange a meeting between him and Natasha before leaving. Natasha later pays Cain to keep quiet and stay away from their family.

In July 2010 Mark's body is discovered by Sam Dingle (James Hooton) whilst he is walking his dog. Nathan and Natasha agree to frame Faye for the murder. But Nathan frames Ryan instead, planting the murder weapon at the garage where Ryan works, and after gaining entry to Ryan's home, planting gunpowder residue on one of Ryan's shirts. He also steals one of Ryan's gold necklaces and plants it at the scene of the crime. The day after Mark's body is found, Nathan is arrested and questioned by the police but later released without charge due to a lack of evidence. However, during his interrogation he discovers that Mark was shot from six feet away and that Natasha had been lying when she said that Mark's death had been accidental, during a struggle. When he returns home, Nathan tells Natasha that if she doesn't help prove his innocence, he will report her to the police himself.

Ryan is later arrested after the police discover his chain at the scene of the crime. He is then charged with the murder after the police discover the gun buried at the garage. Nathan taunts Cain, knowing that Cain cannot help Ryan without incriminating himself for fraud and blackmail. At Mark's funeral Nathan is visibly upset at the loss of his father. However he is furious when he sees that Ryan had been given permission to attend the funeral. When Ryan attempts to ask Maisie to believe that he is innocent Nathan attacks him. Asking him if this was Ryan's "final desperate plea" and calling his sibling "pathetic", Nathan is delighted when Natasha tells the prison guards to take Ryan away.

When Maisie discovers a picture on her mobile phone of Ryan wearing his necklace after the murder occurred she becomes convinced of his innocence, much to Nathan's horror. After distracting her in the cafe, he steals her phone from her bag after she goes to the toilet and deletes the picture but she manages to obtain another copy from Katie. After Cain tells Maisie about the blackmail and being paid by Natasha to keep quiet, she confronts Nathan and Natasha and demands the truth. She accuses Nathan of committing the murder and brands him a coward. Nathan is horrified that his sister thinks he is a murderer and begs Natasha to tell Maisie he is innocent and she does so. But Maisie does not believe them and leaves the village.

When Mark's will is read, Nathan receives his inheritance and flaunts his wealth, telling Faye and David that he will be test driving new cars. Nathan is outraged when Faye tells them she will contest the will. Nathan later visits Ryan is prison to gloat and mockingly asks him to tell Faye not to contest the will. When Nathan implies that he will hurt Faye, Ryan attacks him and the brothers have to be separated. Nathan later discovers that Ryan is in a relationship with prison guard Abi Peterson (Catherine Tyldesley) when he sees her leaving Faye's house and recognizes her from the prison visiting room. Abi calls him scumbag and he threatens to tell the prison service. Abi is later transferred to another prison. Nathan lets himself into Faye's house after she accidentally leaves the back door open and taunts her, telling her that Ryan's relationship with Abi would have serious repercussions for him at the trial. Faye throws Nathan out.

Maisie later returns to the village and avoids Nathan, whenever he comes near her. She goes to stay at Faye's house and Nathan accuses her of trying to prove the innocence of their father's killer. Nathan later tells Natasha that he can't cope with lying to Maisie any more and considers telling her the truth. But Natasha tells him that because Maisie is fragile, due to her previous mental health problems, the truth would be too much for her and it would cause her to go off the rails again. Nathan breaks down in tears in his mother's arms.

The following day, Nathan tells Natasha he is looking forward to seeing Ryan get imprisoned and she is relieved to have him on her side again. Maisie asks to meet Nathan and again asks him the truth about Mark's death but again he tells her that Ryan is the killer. She leaves angrily. When Ryan's trial begins Nathan is nervous about giving evidence. However, when he testifies against his brother, he gives the jury the impression that Ryan is unstable due to his relationship with Maisie and the revelations about their true identities, and that Ryan is jealous of the Wylde's for having the family he never had. After giving evidence, Nathan is kidnapped by Cain and held captive in the Dingles' old barn. He tries to free himself but is unsuccessful. He offers Cain money but Cain refuses it and tells Nathan that if Ryan is found guilty, he will kill him but would release him if he is found not guilty. He pours beer over Nathan and taunts him. After Jai Sharma (Chris Bisson) and Cain's girlfriend and second cousin Charity Tate (Emma Atkins) try to enter the barn and nearly discover Nathan, Cain moves him to an abandoned barn on the moors.

Charity follows Cain to the barn and discovers he is holding Nathan captive. Whilst Cain and Charity argue, Nathan tries to free himself and is nearly successful but Cain catches him in time and with Charity's help, holds him down and reties the ropes holding him. After Ryan is found guilty Cain receives a text message telling him of the development and he tells Nathan things have got a lot worse for him. Nathan is terrified. Cain summons Maisie to the barn and when Nathan sees her, he begs her to help him. Maisie refuses and demands the truth from Nathan about the circumstances of their father's death, still believing Nathan to be the killer.
She attacks Nathan with a piece of wood in an attempt to get him to confess to the murder. Distraught and believing that Maisie would kill him, Nathan reveals that Natasha is Mark's killer but Maisie refuses to believe him. Cain goes to Home Farm and summons Natasha and Will. They arrive in time to see Maisie about to hit Nathan with the wood. In order to pacify Maisie, Natasha confesses that she killed Mark. Maisie calls the police and Nathan begs Natasha to run away and tell the police Cain forced her to confess but Natasha refuses and is arrested.

The following day Nathan walks through the village in a daze still recuperating from his injuries, inflicted on him by Cain and Maisie. Nathan visits Maisie at Faye's house and convinces her to visit Natasha in prison. Maisie apologizes to Nathan to believing him to be the killer. When Maisie visits Natasha and demands the whole truth, Natasha cover for Nathan and does not tell Maisie of his involvement in framing Ryan. When she returns to Home Farm, Maisie admits that she would try to be a family with Nathan again for Will's sake. Maisie moves back in with Nathan and Will at Home Farm despite Ryan's objections. After the Wyldes decide to leave Emmerdale and move back to London for a fresh start, Nathan is approached by Declan who offers to buy out Natasha's 49% ownership of Home Farm. He tells Nathan that if he convinces his mother to sell to him then Nathan would receive the money from Natasha's share of Home Farm instead of Natasha receiving it. Natasha signs over all her assets to Nathan.

Nathan refuses point blank to accept Declan's offer so he sets about finding a new buyer. After a few weeks, he finally finds a buyer and celebrates in The Woolpack by drinking a glass of champagne with barmaid Alicia Gallagher (Natalie Anderson), Leyla's sister. Ryan tries to start an argument with Nathan and after he insults Alicia, Nathan defends her and squares up to Ryan. Ryan leaves the pub and throws a brick through Nathan's car window. Nathan then attacks Ryan and Maisie is forced to separate them. Alicia then leaves after Leyla and Davids tell her what Nathan is really like. The buyer comes to look at Home Farm, and then subsequently reduces her offer. Nathan is furious and refuses to accept, but after Maisie begs him to reconsider, he does so and signs the paperwork. When he introduces the buyer to Declan, he is outraged to discover that he has been tricked when it is revealed that the buyer is Declan's ex-wife Ella Hart (Corrinne Wicks). Nathan refuses to let Declan have Home Farm but knows that he is unable to do anything as the deeds have been signed over.

Nathan attends Natasha's sentencing and is horrified when she is ordered to serve a minimum term of 21 years by the judge. Nathan drowns his sorrows in the pub and goads Ryan about being rich and having Maisie and Will choose him over Ryan. Ryan tries to attack Nathan and Declan and Cain are forced to restrain him. Cain orders Nathan to leave the pub and Ryan vows revenge on his brother. He and Declan concoct a plan to bring Nathan down. Ryan goes to Home Farm whilst Nathan is packing up and demands the truth about why Nathan set him up for Mark's murder. After Nathan gloats, Ryan again pleads for the truth, and tricks Nathan into confessing to setting him up after accusing Natasha of doing it because Nathan was too stupid. Unbeknownst to Nathan, Declan had hidden a recording device under the sofa that had picked up everything he had said. Ryan then plays the recording to Maisie and she angrily confronts Nathan. Furious that he had lied to her again and disgusted with his actions, Maisie leaves Home Farm despite Nathan's pleas for her to stay. He also begs Will but he is equally disgusted with Nathan for lying and leaves with Maisie.

The following day Nathan goes to Ryan's house. Ryan goads Nathan and threatens to call the police and unless Nathan gets down on his knees and begs. Nathan refuses at first but when Ryan picks up the phone, he complies out of desperation much to Ryan's enjoyment. He offers Ryan anything to make up for what he has done. Ryan said that he should give his money and put it to a trust fund for Will. When he told Maisie this, he doesn't realise that Ryan was standing behind him. He pinned him towards his car and told them that if he goes anywhere near Will or Maisie again, they will go straight to the police and if he doesn't, Maisie will. He went back to the office, asking where his belongings are. Declan says they are in storage and he had nothing all along. He then demands his keys to the house and the car. Nathan purposely drops them on the floor. Declan throws him to the floor, standing on his back, ordering him to pick them up. Nathan does so and Declan throws him outside onto the driveway, telling him to get lost. Nathan gets up and walks away, leaving Emmerdale with nothing, having lost his belongings, his money and his family, and he is never seen nor heard from again.

Character creation and development

Casting 
On 19 January 2009, media entertainment website Digital Spy reported that Emmerdale would be introducing Natasha (Amanda Donohoe) and Mark Wylde's (Maxwell Caulfield) three children. Actor Lyndon Ogbourne was cast in the role of Nathan, the eldest child of Natasha and Mark and the brother of Maisie (Alice Coulthard) and Will (Oscar Lloyd). Of his casting, Ogbourne stated: "I am really excited to be playing the role of Nathan Wylde. He is a bit of a rogue and I'm looking forward to bringing out his darker side. He's definitely not as nice as he seems." Asked about if he has settled in Ogbourne said: "It's been really cool. I'd heard amazing things about the cast and crew before I joined and it's cheesy to say it but it's entirely true - everyone's so warm and welcoming. It's very much been a case of me being thrown in at the deep end with long, all-consuming days. But I think that's the best way to be, though."

Characterisation
ITV1 describe Nathan as "scheming and manipulative", and "always wants his own way". Channel Five's soap opera reporting website Holy Soap describe him as "privileged".

Reception
Holy Soap describe Nathan's most memorable moment as: "Being kicked in the groin by Leyla after she found out he was manipulating her and David." Nathan was nominated in the category of "Villain of the Year" at the 2011 British Soap Awards.

See also
List of Emmerdale characters (2009)
List of soap opera villains

References

Emmerdale characters
Television characters introduced in 2009
Fictional businesspeople
Male characters in television
Male villains